Royal Prussian Jagdstaffel 25, commonly abbreviated as Jasta 25, was a "hunting group" (fighter squadron) of the Luftstreitkräfte, the air arm of the Imperial German Army during World War I. The squadron would score 54 aerial victories during the War – 46 enemy aircraft and eight opposing observation balloons. It would suffer two pilots killed in action, one pilot killed in a flying accident, and two others injured in mishaps.

History
Jasta 25 was founded on 28 November 1916, and mobilized on 1 December. It began operations in Macedonia, using Halberstadt D.IIs. It scored its first success on 10 December 1916, and took its first casualty on 18 February 1917. It continued operations until the end of the war brought about the dissolution of the Luftstreitkräfte.

Commanding officers (Staffelführer)
 Friedrich-Karl Burckhardt: 2 December 1916 – 1 February 1918
 August Rose: 1 February 1918 – 11 November 1918

Duty stations
 Prilep: 28 November 1916 – 13 March 1917
 Kanatlarci: 13 March 1917 – 1 June 1918
 Kalkova: 1 June 1918 – 11 November 1918

Notable personnel
A quartet of decorated flying aces served with the unit. They were:
 Gerhard Fieseler, winner of the Military Merit Cross and Iron Cross
 Reinhard Treptow, Iron Cross
 Otto Brauneck, Iron Cross
 Friedrich-Karl Burckhardt, Iron Cross

Aircraft and operations
 Halberstadt D.II
 Albatros D.III
 Roland D.IIa

References

Bibliography
 

25
Military units and formations established in 1916
1916 establishments in Germany
Military units and formations disestablished in 1918
1918 disestablishments in Germany